Intervilles  is a French comedy game show first broadcast in 1962. The show was based on a previous Italian programme. It featured teams representing towns in France competing in a series of games, some of which involved live cows and bulls (referred to as the vachettes). The show was aired from July 17, 1962, on RTF, then on ORTF from 1964 to 1973. After 12 years of absence, it reappeared on July 10, 1985, on FR3, then from July 4, 1986, to September 6, 1999, on TF1 despite allegations of cheating in 1997. France 2 aired the show from July 5, 2004, then France 3 from June 23, 2006, to August 26, 2009.

A special programme was broadcast on France 2 on June 29, 2013, to mark the show's 50th anniversary, and an international version was broadcast on Gulli from 2014 to 2016. In 2019, it was announced that the programme would be revived, albeit without including the vachettes.

Background 
Intervilles was created as an adaption of the Italian programme , which pitted two teams representing separate towns against each other in a series of games and obstacle courses. When the 1962 Tour de France was not broadcast on French television due to a dispute over allowing commercial advertising on the Tour, Intervilles was created to fill the time. The original rule brought in by the creator Guy Lux was that towns could only participate if they had 20,000 inhabitants or less to avoid big cities because of a belief they lacked local pride. The first episode was between Saint-Amand-les-Eaux and Armentières in Dax in an open-air arena in front of 6,000 spectators. Reportedly it became so popular that the President of France, Charles de Gaulle would rearrange his official schedule to watch it. The programme inspired the British programme It's a Knockout.

In the 1990s,  claimed that the games were rigged to keep up suspense by soaping up surfaces for the team in the lead. This was after Chiabodo had been fired from the programme by TF1 after having been accused of cheating by Le Canard enchaîné newspaper. Chiabodo was accused of helping Puy du Fou win in 1996 and 1997 by indicating quiz answers to them using his hands. The mayor of Mont-de-Marsan which opposed Puy du Fou in the 1997 final made the allegation of cheating by stating: "Nous ne sommes pas venus ici en culottes de chou nous faire brouter le cul par des lapins" ("We did not come here in cabbage breeches to have our asses eaten by rabbits"). Puy du Foy sued for defamation and the losers of the previous year Pont-Saint-Esprit also sued Chiabodo, alleging that he tried to put their contestants off by making negative comments towards them. Chiabodo sued Le Canard enchaîné for 400,000 francs but was only awarded a token 1 franc in damages.

In 2013, a special anniversary programme was broadcast on France 2 to celebrate 50 years of the programme. The episode included a repeat of the original final between teams representing Dax and Saint-Amand-les-Eaux. This was done in the hopes of a revival to be broadcast the next year.

Vachettes 
Intervilles became well known for its use of horned cows and young bulls in the games, referred to as the "vachettes" (cowhides). The bulls were not originally a part of the programme, but when Lux visited Buglose in South West France, he was persuaded to include bulls after seeing the popularity of cattle shows. He asked local breeder Joseph Labat to provide the bulls, an agreement that continued through three generations of the Labat family. The bulls were adolescents and entered the ring with rubber balls on their horns for safety. The vachette was let loose to disrupt the competitors and would often attack them by goring them. The vachettes were not trained in any way and were allowed to behave naturally. Individual cows were selected for the programme based upon their temperament.

In the 2000s, a cow called Rosa became a popular star of the programme. She appeared in every episode from her debut in 2004 to the series' end in 2009 and appeared in the 2013 anniversary special. With a black head and white body, she had a reputation for being very aggressive towards contestants but having intelligence to knock down sets when needed. She was later given her own game called "Rosa Strike". Even after the programme finished, fans of the programme would visit the Labat's farm to see Rosa. When she died in 2020, it made national news in France.

In 2019, it was announced by France Télévisions that Intervilles would be revived but that it would not include the vachettes. There was a negative reaction to this from towns in southern France, where bullfighting is common. They accused the network of having been cowed by animal rights activists and moving towards "Anglo-Saxon customs". The former host Nagui supported the move claiming he did not like seeing how the animals were treated when he was the host. In response to that statement, Teddy Labat countered by saying that the animals were treated well and pointed out that Nagui took no interest in their well-being behind the scenes during filming. Fifty towns and cities agreed to take part in a boycott of the revival until the cows were returned. Due to the COVID-19 pandemic in France, filming for the revival was delayed.

Hosts

References

External links 
 
 Official website

1962 French television series debuts
2009 French television series endings
1960s French television series
1970s French television series
1980s French television series
1990s French television series
2000s French television series
French game shows